is a train station in Miyakonojō, Miyazaki Prefecture, Japan. It is operated by JR Kyushu and is on the Kitto Line.

Lines

Layout 
The station consists of an island platform serving two tracks at grade with a siding. There is no station building but a shed has been set up at the station entrance as a waiting room. A level crossing and ramp leads to the island platform which also has a shelter. Parking and a bike shed are available at the station forecourt.

Adjacent stations

History
In the second phase of expansion, the track was extended southeast to Tanigashira which opened as the eastern terminus on 11 May 1913. On 6 December 1932, the same stretch was separated out and was designated as the Kitto Line with Miyakonojō as the starting point. With the privatization of Japanese National Railways (JNR), the successor of JGR, on 1 April 1987, Tanigashira came under the control of JR Kyushu.

Passenger statistics
In fiscal 2016, the station was used by an average of 65 passengers (boarding only) per day.

See also
List of railway stations in Japan

References

External links

  

Railway stations in Miyazaki Prefecture
Railway stations in Japan opened in 1913